There are about 660 known moth species of Réunion. The moths (mostly nocturnal) and butterflies (mostly diurnal) together make up the taxonomic order Lepidoptera.

This is a list of moth species which have been recorded in Réunion, an island in the Indian Ocean.

Arctiidae

Argina amanda 
Argina astrea 
Eilema borbonica 
Eilema francki 
Eilema squalida 
Nyctemera insulare 
Nyctemera virgo 
Thumatha fuscescens 
Utetheisa diva 
Utetheisa elata 
Utetheisa lotrix 
Utetheisa pulchella 
Utetheisa pulchelloides

Autostichidae
Autosticha pelodes

Batrachedridae
Batrachedra arenosella 
Idioglossa bigemma

Bedelliidae
Bedellia somnulentella

Blastobasidae
Lanteantenna inana

Carposinidae
Peragrarchis martirea 
Peritrichocera barboniella 
Peritrichocera bougreauella 
Peritrichocera bipectinata 
Peritrichocera tsilaosa 
Scopalostoma melanoparea 
Scopalostoma nigromaculella

Choreutidae
Anthophila emplecta 
Brenthia leptocosma 
Choreutis aegyptiaca 
Tebenna cornua 
Tebenna micalis

Copromorphidae
Copromorpha mesobactris

Cosmopterigidae
Calicotis attiei 
Cosmopterix attenuatella 
Anatrachyntis simplex 
Eteobalea vinsoni 
Macrobathra cineralella

Crambidae

Acentropinae
Elophila acornutus 
Elophila difflualis 
Elophila melagynalis 
Eoophyla guillermetorum 
Eoophyla reunionalis 
Parapoynx diminutalis 
Parapoynx fluctuosalis 
Parapoynx ingridae

Crambinae
Angustalius hapaliscus 
Chilo sacchariphagus 
Conocramboides seychellellus 
Culladia achroellum 
Microcrambon paphiellus

Cybalomiinae
Trichophysetis preciosalis

Evergestinae
Crocidolomia pavonana

Glaphyriinae
Hellula undalis 
Hydriris ornatalis

Musotiminae
Ambia gueneealis 
Cilaus longinasus 
Neurophyseta upupalis

Noordiinae 
Noorda blitealis

Odontiinae
Autocharis marginata

Pyraustinae
Achyra coelatalis 
Euclasta whalleyi 
Hyalobathra filalis 
Ischnurges lancinalis 
Pagyda pulvereiumbralis 
Pyrausta phoenicealis 
Udea ferrugalis 
Uresiphita polygonalis

Scopariinae
Scoparia benigna 
Scoparia resinodes

Spilomelinae
Agathodes musivalis 
Bocchoris borbonensis 
Bocchoris gueyraudi 
Bocchoris inspersalis 
Botyodes asialis 
Bradina admixtalis 
Cadarena pudoraria 
Cirrhochrista etiennei 
Cnaphalocrocis grucheti 
Cnaphalocrocis poeyalis 
Cnaphalocrocis trapezalis 
Cnaphalocrocis trebiusalis 
Condylorrhiza zyphalis 
Diaphana indica 
Diasemia monostigma 
Diasemiopsis ramburialis 
Duponchelia fovealis 
Eurrhyparodes bracteolalis 
Eurrhyparodes tricoloralis 
Filodes costivitralis 
Ghesquierellana hirtusalis 
Glyphodes cadeti 
Glyphodes mascarenalis 
Glyphodes shafferorum 
Haritalodes derogata 
Herpetogramma admensalis 
Herpetogramma basalis 
Herpetogramma brunnealis 
Herpetogramma couteyeni 
Herpetogramma debressyi 
Herpetogramma dorcalis 
Herpetogramma licarsisalis 
Herpetogramma minoralis 
Herpetogramma phaeopteralis 
Herpetogramma stultalis 
Herpetogramma vacheri 
Hodebertia testalis 
Hymenia perspectalis 
Maruca vitrata 
Mabra eryxalis 
Nausinoe geometralis 
Nomophila noctuella 
Notarcha quaternalis 
Omiodes dnopheralis 
Omiodes indicata 
Orphanostigma abruptalis 
Palpita vitrealis 
Pardomima viettealis 
Piletocera reunionalis 
Piletocera viperalis 
Pleuroptya balteata 
Pleuroptya violacealis 
Poliobotys ablactalis 
Prophantis smaragdina 
Pyrausta childrenalis 
Pyrausta pastrinalis 
Psara ferruginalis 
Salbia haemorrhoidalis 
Sameodes cancellalis 
Sceliodes laisalis 
Spoladea recurvalis 
Stemorrhages sericea 
Syllepte albopunctum 
Syllepte argillosa 
Syllepte christophalis 
Syllepte ovialis 
Synclera traducalis 
Terastia subjectalis 
Thliptoceras longicornalis 
Zebronia phenice

Elachistidae
Chrysoclista hygrophilella 
Ethmia nigroapicella

Gelechiidae

Anarsia citromitra   
Anarsia dodonaea 
Anarsia tremata 
Anarsia vinsonella 
Aristotelia bicomis 
Brachmia fuscogramma 
Dactylethrella tetrametra  
Dichomeris acuminata 
Epiphractis amphitricha 
Ephysteris subdiminutella 
Dichomeris ianthes 
Faristenia tamarinda 
Helcystogramma convolvuli 
Idiophantis croconota 
Idiophantis valerieae 
Leuronoma fauvella 
Mesophleps palpigera 
Mesophleps safranella 
Mesophleps silacella 
Phthorimaea operculella 
Sitotroga cerealella 
Sitotroga psacasta 
Stegasta variana  
Syncopacma leportensis 
Syncopacma linella 
Thiotricha tenuis

Geometridae

Ascotis terebraria 
Asthenotricha lophopterata 
Asthenotricha tripogonias 
Casuariclystis latifascia 
Chiasmia crassilembaria 
Chlorerythra borbonica 
Chloroclystis androgyna 
Chloroclystis angelica 
Chloroclystis costicavata 
Chloroclystis derasata 
Chloroclystis exilipicta 
Chloroclystis latifasciata 
Cleora acaciaria 
Collix inaequata 
Collix intrepida 
Comostolopsis leuconeura 
Conolophia conscitaria 
Cyclophora lyciscaria 
Darisodes orygaria 
Dithecodes purpuraria 
Ectropis distinctaria 
Ectropis herbuloti 
Eois suarezensis 
Erastria madecassaria 
Eupithecia graphiticata 
Gymnoscelis rubricata 
Mesocolpia nanula  
Mimandria diospyrata 
Orthonama quadrisecta 
Pingasa hypoleucaria 
Prasinocyma cellularia 
Psilocerea monochroma 
Racotis incompletaria 
Rhodometra sacraria 
Scopula caesaria 
Scopula internataria 
Scopula lactaria 
Scopula minorata 
Scopula serena 
Somatina lia 
Thalassodes hyraria 
Thalassodes quadraria 
Traminda obversata 
Xanthorhoe borbonicata 
Xanthorhoe magnata

Glyphipterigidae
Chrysocentris costella 
Chrysocentris ditiorana

Gracillariidae

Acrocercops coffeifoliella 
Acrocercops macrochalca 
Aristaea bathracma 
Aristaea onychota 
Aspilapteryx pentaplaca 
Caloptilia xanthochiria 
Callicercops triceros 
Corythoxestis pentarcha 
Dialectica geometra 
Dialectica anselmella 
Dialectica pyramidota  
Phodoryctis caerulea 
Phyllocnistis citrella 
Phyllocnistis saligna 
Spulerina hexalocha 
Phyllonorycter ruizivorus

Hyblaeidae
Hyblaea apricans

Immidae
Imma infima

Lymantriidae
Euproctis annulipes

Lyonetiidae
Leucoptera coffeella 
Leucoptera meyricki 
Lyonetia hygrophilella

Noctuidae

Achaea catella 
Achaea echo 
Achaea euryplaga 
Achaea faber 
Achaea finita 
Achaea infinita 
Achaea leucopasa 
Achaea lienardi 
Achaea oedipodina 
Achaea trapezoides 
Achaea violaceofascia 
Acontia luteola 
Agrapha etiennei 
Agrapha orbifer 
Agrotis alluaudi 
Agrotis ipsilon 
Agrotis longidentifera 
Agrotis viettei 
Aletia decaryi 
Aletia infrargyrea 
Aletia operosa 
Aletia pyrausta 
Ametropalpis nasuta 
Amyna acuta 
Amyna axis 
Amyna incertalis 
Anomis alluaudi 
Anomis auragoides 
Anomis campanalis 
Anomis flava 
Anomis lophognatha 
Anticarsia rubricans 
Apamea desegaulxi 
Apospasta rubiana 
Araeopteron obliquifascia 
Araeopteron papaziani  *
Argyrogramma signata 
Argyrolopha costibarbata 
Arsina silenalis 
Asota borbonica 
Athetis ignava 
Athetis pigra 
Autoba costimacula 
Brithys crini 
Callixena versicolora 
Callopistria bernei 
Callopistria cariei 
Callopistria latreillei 
Callopistria maillardi 
Callopistria yerburii 
Catada obscura 
Catephia squamosa 
Chalciope delta 
Chasmina tibialis 
Chlumetia borbonica 
Chrysodeixis chalcites 
Condica conducta 
Condica pauperata 
Conservula cinisigna 
Corgatha terracotta 
Ctenoplusia dorfmeisteri 
Ctenoplusia limbirena 
Cyligramma fluctuosa 
Cyligramma limacina 
Dichromia legrosi 
Dysgonia angularis 
Dysgonia derogans 
Dysgonia masama 
Dysgonia torrida 
Erebus walkeri 
Ericeia albangula 
Ericeia congregata 
Ericeia congressa 
Ericeia inangulata 
Ericeia lituraria 
Eublemma anachoresis 
Eublemma augusta 
Eublemma baccalix 
Eublemma cochylioides 
Eublemma pyrosticta 
Eublemma viettei 
Eublemmoides apicimacula 
Eudocima fullonia 
Eudocima imperator 
Euplexia borbonica 
Eustrotia bernica 
Eutelia blandiatrix 
Feliniopsis tenera 
Gesonia obeditalis 
Gesonia stictigramma 
Gracilodes angulalis 
Gracilodes nysa 
Grammodes bifasciata 
Grammodes stolida 
Gyrtona polymorpha 
Helicoverpa armigera 
Heliophisma klugii 
Hipoepa fractalis 
Holocryptis interrogationis 
Hydrillodes aviculalis 
Hydrillodes uliginosalis 
Hypena anderesi 
Hypena conscitalis 
Hypena etiennei 
Hypena frappieralis 
Hypena inextensalis 
Hypena laceratalis 
Hypena nasutalis 
Hypena obacerralis 
Hypena ophiusinalis 
Hypena polycyma 
Hypena varialis 
Hypena viettei 
Hypocala florens 
Hypospila thermesina 
Janseodes melanospila 
Lacera alope 
Lacera noctilio 
Leucania hypocapna 
Leucania insulicola 
Leucania nebulosa 
Leucania phaea 
Leucania prominens 
Leucania pseudoloreyi 
Lithacodia blandula 
Lophoptera litigiosa 
Lophoruza mascarena 
Luceria amazonensis  
Lygephila salax 
Matarum etiennei 
Maxera marchalii 
Megalonycta mediovitta 
Mentaxya palmistarum 
Mocis conveniens 
Mocis frugalis 
Mocis mayeri 
Mocis proverai 
Mocis repanda 
Mythimna borbonensis 
Neostichtis ignorata 
Nodaria cornicalis 
Nodaria mouriesi 
Ochropleura leucogaster 
Ochropleura megaplecta 
Oedebasis longipalpis 
Oedebasis ovipennis 
Ophiusa legendrei 
Oraesia pierronii 
Oruza divisa 
Ozarba perplexa 
Ozopteryx basalis 
Pandesma muricolor 
Pericyma mendax 
Pericyma vinsonii 
Physula synnaralis 
Pleuronodes apicalis 
Plusiodonta excavata 
Plusiodonta gueneei 
Polydesma umbricola 
Progonia matilei 
Progonia oileusalis 
Proluta deflexa 
Prominea porrecta 
Radara subcupralis Walker, [1866]
Rhesala moestalis 
Rhynchina revolutalis 
Rivula dimorpha 
Rivula dispar 
Serrodes partita 
Serrodes trispila 
Sesamia calamistis 
Simplicia extinctalis 
Simplicia fesseleti 
Simplicia inflexalis 
Simplicia pannalis 
Spodoptera cilium 
Spodoptera exigua 
Spodoptera littoralis 
Spodoptera mauritia 
Stenhypena borbonica 
Stictoptera antemarginata 
Stictoptera poecilosoma 
Syngrapha grosmornensis 
Thyas rubricata 
Thysanoplusia indicator 
Tolna sypnoides 
Trichoplusia florina 
Trichoplusia ni 
Trichoplusia orichalcea 
Trigonodes exportata 
Trigonodes hyppasia 
Vietteania torrentium 
Vittaplusia vittata

Nolidae

Blenina richardi 
Earias biplaga 
Earias insulana 
Garella basalis 
Maceda mansueta 
Maurilia arcuata 
Nola borbonica 
Nola denauxi 
Nola guillermeti 
Nola herbuloti 
Nola melanoscelis 
Nycteola mauritia 
Pardasena virgulana 
Pardoxia graellsii 
Xanthodes albago

Oecophoridae

Ancylometis ansarti 
Ancylometis celineae 
Ancylometis lavergnella 
Ancylometis mulaella 
Ancylometis paulianella 
Ancylometis ribesae 
Ancylometis scaeocosma 
Cenarchis vesana 
Endrosis sarcitrella 
Epiphractis amphitricha 
Epiphractis tryphoxantha 
Metachanda astrapias 
Metachanda anomalella 
Metachanda borbonicella 
Metachanda cafrerella 
Metachanda eucyrtella 
Metachanda hamonella 
Metachanda hugotella 
Metachanda lucasi 
Metachanda nigromaculella 
Metachanda reunionella 
Metantithyra silvestrella 
Metachanda thaleropis 
Orygocera anderesi 
Oxycrates reunionella 
Semnocosma gibeauxella 
Taragmarcha borbonensis 
Tanychastis moreauella

Plutellidae
Plutella xylostella

Praydidae
Prays armynoti 
Prays citri 
Prays sublevatella

Pterophoridae

Pterophorinae

Megalorhipida tessmanni 
Bipunctiphorus dimorpha 
Exelastis phlyctaenias 
Hellinsia madecasseus 
Hepalastis pumilio 
Lantanophaga pusillidactylus 
Megalorhipida leptomeres 
Megalorhipida leucodactyla 
Megalorhipida monsa 
Oidaematophorus borbonicus 
Platyptilia fulva 
Platyptilia grisea 
Platyptilia pseudofulva 
Pterophorus albidus 
Sphenarches anisodactylus 
Stenodacma wahlbergi 
Stenoptilodes taprobanes 
Vietteilus borbonica

Ochyroticinae
Ochyrotica rufa

Pyralidae

Galleriinae
Achroia grisella 
Corcyra cephalonica 
Galleria mellonella 
Lamoria clathrella

Epipaschiinae
Epilepia melapastalis

Chrysauginae
Parachma lequettealis

Pyralinae
Hypsopygia mauritialis 
Hypotia saramitoi  
Ocrasa nostralis 
Pyralis manihotalis 
Pyralis pictalis

Phycitinae
Apomyelois ceratoniae 
Balinskyia monstrosa 
Cactoblastis cactorum 
Cadra cautella 
Ceutholopha isidis  
Candiopella reunionalis  
Cryptoblabes bistriga 
Cryptoblabes gnidiella 
Ephestia callidella 
Epischnia beharella 
Etiella zinckenella 
Flabellobasis capensis 
Maliarpha separatella vectiferella 
Morgabinella billii  
Morosaphycita morosalis 
Oncocera quilicii 
Pempelia strophocomma  
Philotroctis pectinicornella 
Phycita demidovi  
Phycita diaphana 
Phycita irisella 
Plodia interpunctella 
Pseudoceroprepes semipectinella 
Pseudophycitatella leveuleuxi  
Selagiaforma vercambrensis 
Spatulipalpia pectinatella  
Thylacoptila borbonica  
Thylacoptila paurosema

Sphingidae

Acherontia atropos 
Agrius convolvuli 
Basiothia medea 
Cephonodes apus 
Coelonia fulvinotata 
Coelonia solani 
Daphnis nerii 
Euchloron megaera 
Hippotion celerio 
Hippotion eson 
Hippotion gracilis 
Hyles biguttata 
Macroglossum aesalon 
Macroglossum milvus 
Macroglossum soror 
Nephele densoi 
Nephele oenopion

Stathmopodidae
Stathmopoda attiei 
Stathmopoda margabim

Thyrididae
Banisia clathrula

Tineidae

Agnathosia nana 
Amphixystis aromaticella 
Amphixystis fragosa 
Amphixystis guttata 
Amphixystis maillardella 
Amphixystis paroditella 
Amphixystis patelia 
Amphixystis siccata 
Amphixystis serrata 
Amphixystis syntricha 
Dasyses langenieri 
Erechthias nigrocaputis 
Erechthias nigromaculella 
Erechthias richardella 
Eudarcia oceanica 
Opogona dimidiatella 
Opogona etiennella 
Opogona heroicella 
Opogona incorrectella 
Opogona omoscopa 
Opogona phaeochalca 
Opogona sacchari 
Opogona salamolardella 
Opogona sycastella 
Opogona transversata 
Phereoeca praecox 
Praeacedes atomosella 
Protaphreutis borboniella 
Setomorpha rutella 
Tineovertex flavilineata 
Tiquadra etiennei 
Tiquadra guillermeti 
Tiquadra seraphinei 
Tiquadra trancarti

Tortricidae

Adoxophyes microptycha 
Apotoforma smaragdina 
Bactra crithopa 
Bactra pallidior 
Bactra stagnicolana 
Borboniella allomorpha 
Borboniella bifracta 
Borboniella chrysorrhoea 
Borboniella conflatilis 
Borboniella cubophora 
Borboniella gigantella 
Borboniella leucaspis 
Borboniella marmaromorpha 
Borboniella montana 
Borboniella octops 
Borboniella pelecys 
Borboniella peruella 
Borboniella rougonella 
Borboniella spudaea 
Borboniella striatella 
Borboniella tekayaella 
Borboniella viettei 
Borboniella vulpicolor 
Brachiolia amblopis 
Brachiolia egenella 
Clepsis tetraplegma 
Coniostola stereoma 
Cosmetra anthophaga 
Cosmetra spiculifera 
Cosmorrhyncha acrocosma  
Cosmorrhyncha ocellata (Mabille, 1900)
Crocidosema affouchensis Guillermet, 2012
Crocidosema lantana 
Crocidosema plebejana 
Cryptophlebia carreella 
Cryptophlebia colasi 
Cryptophlebia gomyi 
Cryptophlebia peltastica 
Cryptophlebia semilunana 
Cydia corona 
Cydia siderocosma 
Cydia undosa 
Dudua aprobola 
Eccopsis incultana 
Eccopsis praecedens 
Epichoristodes acerbella 
Episimoides erythraea 
Grapholita siderocosma 
Hilarographa vinsonella 
Leguminivora anthracotis 
Leguminivora ptychora 
Lobesia aeolopa 
Lobesia crithopa 
Lobesia rapta 
Lobesia vanillana 
Microsarotis lygistis 
Pandemis electrochroa 
Strepsicrates penechra 
Tetramoera isogramma 
Tetramoera schistaceana 
Thaumatotibia ecnomia 
Thaumatotibia etiennei 
Thaumatotibia eutacta 
Thaumatotibia leucotreta 
Thaumatotibia rassembi 
Thaumatotibia rochata 
Trymalitis scalifera

Uraniidae
Dirades dadanti 
Dirades etiennei 
Dirades theclata

Yponomeutidae
Kessleria gibeauxia 
Xyrosaris canusa

References 

Bippus, M., 2020. Records of Lepidoptera from the Malagasy region with description of new species (Lepidoptera: Tortricidae, Noctuidae, Alucitidae, Choreutidae, Euteliidae, Gelechiidae, Blastobasidae, Pterophoridae, Tonzidae, Tineidae, Praydidae, Cosmopterigidae, Batrachedridae). - Phelsuma 28: 60-100

External links

 01

Reunion
Reunion
Moths
Reunion